Anthony Starke is an American actor. He is well known for his one-episode role in Seinfeld, playing the third-person-speaking character Jimmy in "The Jimmy", as well as playing Jack on The George Carlin Show, on Fox.

Biography
Starke attended Marquette University on the Liberace Foundation Scholarship for Performance, where he won a screen role playing quadriplegic teenager Dean Conroy in the CBS Movie of the Week, First Steps. Starke's first feature film was Nothing in Common with Jackie Gleason and Tom Hanks, playing the part of Cameron. While at Marquette, Starke worked with the Pabst Theater and the Wisconsin Shakespeare Company, appearing in a range of plays spanning classic, modern and musical. After graduating with a B.A. in Theater Arts, he took up acting full-time.

In 1987, Starke played frat president and resident bully Russ in 18 Again. One of Starke's hobbies is martial arts, which he got to show in two scenes with actor Charlie Schlatter. Starke played Truman-Lodge in the James Bond film Licence to Kill in 1989, Chad Finletter in Return of the Killer Tomatoes in 1988 and a U.S. Embassy consultant in the 2007 NCIS episode "Designated Target". Starke also co-starred as the smooth-talking gambler, Ezra Standish in The Magnificent Seven between 1998 and 1999.

In 2002, he also played the role of a demon in a fourth-season episode of Charmed.

In 2009, Starke had a recurring role on the ABC Family television series Make It or Break It as Steve Tanner, the rich father of one of the gymnasts from the training center 'The Rock', Lauren Tanner. He also played the role of Dr. Bob Taylor on Baby on Board. He was also in four episodes of the Disney Channel series Shake It Up as the boyfriend of Cece's mother.

Filmography

Film

Television

References

External links
 
 
 
 Official website

Living people
Male actors from Los Angeles
American male film actors
American male stage actors
American male television actors
Marquette University alumni
Male actors from Syracuse, New York
Year of birth missing (living people)